The 2018 Korean FA Cup, known as the 2018 KEB Hana Bank FA Cup, was the 23rd edition of the Korean FA Cup. Daegu FC qualified for the group stage of the 2019 AFC Champions League after becoming eventual champions.

Qualifying rounds
The draw was held on 23 February 2018.

First round

Second round

Third round

Final rounds
The draw for the round of 32 and round of 16 was held on 10 May 2018.

Bracket

Round of 32

Round of 16

Quarter-finals
The draw for the quarter-finals was held on 20 September 2018.

Semi-finals
The draw for the semi-finals was held on 18 October 2018.

Final

See also
2018 in South Korean football
2018 K League 1
2018 K League 2
2018 Korea National League
2018 K3 League Advanced
2018 K3 League Basic

References

External links
Official website 
Korean FA Cup at Soccerway
KFA regulations 

Korean FA Cup seasons